Clay Township is an inactive township in Shelby County, in the U.S. state of Missouri.

Clay Township was erected in the 1845, taking its name from Kentucky speaker Henry Clay.

References

Townships in Missouri
Townships in Shelby County, Missouri